What We Lose in the Fire We Gain in the Flood is the first studio album by the indie pop band The Mynabirds. It was released by Saddle Creek Records on April 27, 2010 and produced by Richard Swift.

Track listing
All songs written by Laura Burhenn.

Reception

On Metacritic, What We Lose in the Fire We Gain in the Flood has an average score of 77 out of 100, indicating "generally favorable reviews".

James Skinner, writing for Drowned in Sound, praised both Burhenn's vocals and Swift's production, stating that the album "revels in a soulful, brassy buzz that sounds great from the offset and even better on further listening". In a positive review for Pitchfork, Matthew Perpetua favourably compares the album to Burhenn's earlier work with Georgie James, saying "Here, she emerges fully formed with a set of bold, assured songs so elegantly composed that many could pass for old standards". According to Anthony Lombardi of PopMatters, "With such a crowded, convoluted number of artists arriving on the indie scene [...] it's both exciting and comforting to find a talent as raw and solitary as Laura Burhenn's", with this album being "a pure, big-hearted document of strength and spirit that's as affecting and enlivening as anything pop music's past has given us".

References

2010 albums
Albums produced by Richard Swift (singer-songwriter)
The Mynabirds albums
Saddle Creek Records albums
Alternative country albums by American artists